Bearhills Lake is a lake in Alberta, Canada.

Bearhills Lake takes its name from nearby Bear Hills.

See also
List of lakes of Alberta

References

Lakes of Alberta